Derek Trent (born March 21, 1980) is an American former competitive pair skater. He competed for most of his career with Tiffany Vise. On November 17, 2007, Vise and Trent landed the first clean throw quadruple salchow jump in international competition. They officially became the first team to perform that element in international competition.

Because Vise spun and jumped in the clockwise direction and Trent in the counter-clockwise direction. They were a mirror pair.

Personal life
Derek Trent was born in Knoxville, Tennessee. He has two sisters, Kelli and Laura. In 2002, he graduated from the University of Colorado at Colorado Springs with a degree in business and a minor in Spanish. In May 2008, he completed his MBA at the same university.

Skating career

Early years 
Trent began skating in 1987. At age ten, he moved to Colorado Springs, Colorado in order to train. Competing in ice dancing with Eve Chalom, he won the intermediate-level bronze medal at the U.S. Junior Figure Skating Championships in 1993. He and his sister, Kelli Trent, also competed together in ice dancing at the U.S. Junior Championships.

As a single skater, Trent placed 11th in the novice ranks at the 1996 U.S. Championships.

Trent began pair skating as a teenager, coached by Irina Vorobieva. He and Katie Gadkowski won the novice pewter medal at the 1998 U.S. Championships and the junior pewter medal at the 1999 U.S. Championships. With his next skating partner, Brandilyn Sandoval, he won the junior bronze medal at the 2001 U.S. Championships. When that partnership ended, he teamed up with Stacey Pensgen, who was switching from singles. They placed 14th at the 2003 U.S. Championships and parted ways shortly thereafter.

Partnership with Vise 
Trent teamed up with Tiffany Vise in July 2003. They had skated for years at the same rink and her partnership had ended at the same time. Because they were both partnerless, they tried out together, despite the fact that they rotate in opposite directions. Very few teams at the highest level rotate in opposite directions because it makes elements like pair spins and twists much more difficult, due to the fact that one partner will have to "force" themself to rotate in the "wrong" direction in order to complete the element (Vise spun his way on twist lifts). They represented the Broadmoor Skating Club.

Vise/Trent won the bronze medal at their first major event together, the 2003 Golden Spin of Zagreb. Beginning in the 2006–2007 season, Vise/Trent began attempting a throw quadruple salchow jump in competition. At the 2006 Skate Canada International, they were credited with fully rotating the element but not with landing it successfully.

Vise/Trent began the 2007–2008 season at the 2007 Skate Canada, where they placed 5th. During the free skate at the 2007 Trophée Eric Bompard, they became the first-ever pair to successfully execute a throw quad salchow in an international competition. They won the pewter medal at the 2008 U.S. Championships and were sent to the 2008 Four Continents, where they placed 8th.

In the 2008–2009 season, Vise/Trent placed 5th at the 2008 Skate Canada International and the 2008 Trophée Eric Bompard. They placed 8th at the 2009 U.S. Championships. The pair was coached by Doug Ladret and Jill Watson in Scottsdale, Arizona.

On April 30, 2009, Trent announced his retirement from competitive figure skating.

Post-competitive 
Trent works as a coach. He is certified as a judge on the national level.

Programs
(with Vise)

Competitive highlights 
GP: Grand Prix; JGP: Junior Grand Prix

With Vise

With Pensgen

With Sandoval

With Gadkowski

Singles career

References

External links

Official site

Living people
American male pair skaters
1980 births
Sportspeople from Knoxville, Tennessee
Figure skaters from Colorado Springs, Colorado
20th-century American people
21st-century American people